"Tie a Yellow Ribbon Round the Ole Oak Tree" is a song recorded by Tony Orlando and Dawn. 
It was written by Irwin Levine and L. Russell Brown and produced by Hank Medress and Dave Appell, with Motown/Stax backing vocalist Telma Hopkins, Joyce Vincent Wilson and her sister Pamela Vincent on backing vocals. It was a worldwide hit for the group in 1973.

The single reached the top 10 in ten countries, in eight of which it topped the charts. It reached number one on both the US and UK charts for four weeks in April 1973, number one on the Australian chart for seven weeks from May to July 1973 and number one on the New Zealand chart for ten weeks from June to August 1973. It was the top-selling single in 1973 in both the US and UK.

In 2008, Billboard ranked the song as the 37th biggest song of all time in its issue celebrating the 50th anniversary of the Hot 100. For the 60th anniversary in 2018, the song still ranked in the top 50, at number 46. This song is the origin of the yellow color of the Liberal Party of Cory Aquino, the party that ousted the Marcos dictatorship in the People Power Revolution of 1986.

Synopsis
The song is told from the point of view of someone who has "done his time" in the military or a prisoner-of-war camp ("I'm really still in prison and my love, she holds the key") but is uncertain if he will be welcomed home. 

He writes to his love, asking her to tie a yellow ribbon around the "ole oak tree" in front of the house (which the bus will pass by) if she wants him to return to her life; if he does not see such a ribbon, he will remain on the bus (taking that to mean he is unwelcome) and understand her reasons ("put the blame on me").  He asks the bus driver to check, fearful of not seeing anything.

To his amazement, the entire bus cheers the response – there are 100 yellow ribbons around the tree, a sign he is very much welcome.

Origins of the song
The origin of the idea of a yellow ribbon as remembrance may have been the 19th-century practice that some women allegedly had of wearing a yellow ribbon in their hair to signify their devotion to a husband or sweetheart serving in the U.S. Cavalry. The song "'Round Her Neck She Wears a Yeller Ribbon", tracing back centuries but copyrighted by George A. Norton in 1917, and later inspiring the John Wayne movie She Wore a Yellow Ribbon, is a reference to this. The symbol of a yellow ribbon became widely known in civilian life in the 1970s as a reminder that an absent loved one, either in the military or in jail, would be welcomed home on their return. During the Vietnam War, 

In October 1971, newspaper columnist Pete Hamill wrote a piece for the New York Post called "Going Home". In it, he told a variant of the story, in which college students on a bus trip to the beaches of Fort Lauderdale make friends with an ex-convict who is watching for a yellow handkerchief on a roadside oak in Brunswick, Georgia. Hamill claimed to have heard this story in oral tradition. In June 1972, nine months later, Reader's Digest reprinted "Going Home". Also in June 1972, ABC-TV aired a dramatized version of it in which James Earl Jones played the role of the returning ex-con. According to L. Russell Brown, he read Hamill's story in the Reader's Digest, and suggested to his songwriting partner Irwin Levine that they write a song based on it.  Levine and Brown then registered for copyright the song which they called "Tie a Yellow Ribbon 'Round the Ole Oak Tree".  At the time, the writers said they heard the story while serving in the military. Pete Hamill was not convinced and filed suit for infringement. Hamill dropped his suit after folklorists working for Levine and Brown turned up archival versions of the story that had been collected before "Going Home" had been written. 

In 1991, Brown said the song was based on a story he had read about a soldier headed home from the Civil War who wrote his beloved that if he was still welcome, she should tie a handkerchief around a certain tree. He said the handkerchief was not particularly romantic, so he and Mr. Levine changed it to a yellow ribbon.

Levine and Brown first offered the song to Ringo Starr, but Al Steckler of Apple Records told them that they should be ashamed of the song and described it as "ridiculous".

The 2008 film The Yellow Handkerchief, conceived as a remake of the original Japanese film, uses a plot based on the Pete Hamill story.

Chart and sales performance
In April 1973, the recording by Dawn featuring Tony Orlando reached No. 1 in the Billboard Hot 100 (chart date 21 April 1973) in the US, and stayed at No. 1 for four weeks.  "Tie A Yellow Ribbon" sold 3 million records in the US in three weeks.  It also reached No. 1 on the Adult Contemporary chart, and BMI calculated that radio stations had played it 3 million times from seventeen continuous years of airplay. Billboard ranked it as the No. 1 song for 1973. It also reached No. 1 in the UK and Australia, and has sold one million copies in the UK.  In New Zealand, the song spent 10 weeks at number one.

Weekly charts

Year-end charts

All-time charts

Cover versions

 The song enjoyed duplicate success on country radio, as a cover version by Johnny Carver. Carver's rendition - simply titled "Yellow Ribbon" - was a top 10 hit on the Billboard Hot Country Singles chart in June 1973. Carver's version also reached Number One on the RPM Country Tracks chart in Canada. Musically similar, the only difference in the song is the substitution of the minor expletive "damn" (in the lyric, "Now the whole damn bus is cheering") with "darn".
 Bing Crosby recorded the song on 8 June 1973 with an orchestra conducted by Billy Byers for Daybreak Records.
 Also in 1973, Jim Nabors covered the song on his album The Twelfth of Never (Columbia KC 32377).
 Also in 1973, Italian singer Domenico Modugno had a minor hit in Italy with a cover in his language: "Appendi un nastro giallo". The lyrics are a very faithful translation of the original, the only difference is that instead of watching the tree from a bus, the Italian singer watches it from a tram.
 Also in 1973, Los Mismos covered the song as "Pon Una Cinta En El Viejo Roble" (Belter 08-263).
 Perry Como included the song in his album And I Love You So (1973).
 Dean Martin included the song in his album You're the Best Thing That Ever Happened to Me (1973).
 In Chile, Roberto Inglez achieved great success with his version, which was number one on the national radio for the 11 September 1973.
 Lou Sino covered the song on his Now album (1973). It was also the B side of his single, "She's Got to Be a Saint", released on Bengal 112873.
 Kay Starr did a version of this song on the country pop charts in 1974, hitting number 12.
 Frank Sinatra included the song in his album Some Nice Things I've Missed (1974)
 Max Bygraves included the song in his album Singalong with Max (1975).
 Freddy Fender covered the song in a bilingual version entitled El Roble Viejo in 1975
 The song was covered by Lawrence Welk, whose orchestra performed it many times on his television program during the late 1970s; a studio version was released in 1975 on his album Lawrence Welk's Most Requested TV Favorites (Champagne Style).
 The song was performed on The Muppet Show twice: the first was in the form of the rewritten parody "Tie a Yellow Ribbit Round the Old Oak Tree" in the Steve Martin episode and then as an instrumental during the "Pigs in Space" segment of the Carol Burnett episode.
 The song was covered by Bobby Goldsboro on a multi-artist compilation album entitled Storytellers released in 1976.
 Harry Connick Jr. - for his album 30 (2001).
 In 2003 Dolly Parton recorded a cover on her patriotic album For God and Country.
  recorded Finnish version "Nosta lippu salkoon" in 1973.
 The anticomedian Ted Chippington performed a quasi-cover of this song on his debut album Man in a Suitcase, "Rocking Ribbons."
Singer Eric D. Johnson covered this song in the film Our Idiot Brother. It was released in 2011 alongside the film in the motion picture soundtrack.

In popular culture

 Later in 1973, Connie Francis had a minor hit in Australia with an answer song, "The Answer (Should I Tie a Yellow Ribbon Round the Old Oak Tree?)". Her version remained in the top 40 for three weeks, peaking at number 31.
 In 1975, the song was sung by Dean Martin in the TV special Lucy Gets Lucky.
 In 1977, the song was sung by Andy Kaufman, while playing his character Tony Clifton, on HBO.
 The song had renewed popularity in 1979, in the wake of the Iranian hostage crisis.
 The song appeared in the 1982 movie An Officer and a Gentleman, played by a band at the Navy Ball. 
 The song was performed by David Alan Grier, as Don "No Soul" Simmons, over the closing credits of Amazon Women on the Moon (1987).
 In the 1993 Wallace and Gromit short, The Wrong Trousers, the short's antagonist, Feathers McGraw, listens to an instrumental cover of the song on the radio after settling into his new room.
 On the show Dinosaurs, in the episode "Driving Miss Ethyl" (first aired on 29 June 1994), several characters sing this song. 
 In 1999, S Club 7 performed the song for their hit TV series Miami 7. It was featured in the second episode.
 In a 2005 episode of Las Vegas, Tony Orlando (guest-starring as himself) performs the song at the end of the episode before an audience that includes Don Knotts (also guest-starring as himself in one of his last acting roles.)
 Comedian Victor Lewis-Smith recorded a sketch on BBC Radio in which he claims to have an annoying song playing in his head, but he can't remember what the name of it is. "It goes... 'Tie a yellow ribbon round the ole oak tree...' But WHAT'S IT CALLED?"
 The song is referenced in "The Ones That Didn't Make It Back Home," which hit #1 on Country airplay in 2019.
 On The Kids in the Hall, Kevin McDonald and Dave Foley, as the Sizzler Sisters, sing this as part of their lounge act.
 The song is featured in The Simpsons when sung by Disco Stu in a karaoke bar on "Treehouse of Horror XXIV" (season 27, episode 5).

Association with the People Power Revolution

In the Philippines, the song was best known for its use in the return of exiled politician Benigno Aquino Jr. in 1983, when supporters tied yellow ribbons on trees in anticipation of his arrival. However, Aquino was assassinated at Manila International Airport. This sparked protests and the People Power three years later that led to the overthrow of President Ferdinand Marcos' regime, and the accession of his opponent, Aquino's widow Corazón. Yellow was also the campaign symbol of their son, Benigno Aquino III, who eventually became president in 2010 following his mother's death the previous year.

Association with the 2014 Hong Kong Protests
During the 2014 Hong Kong Protests the song was routinely performed by pro-democracy protestors and sympathetic street musicians as a reference to the yellow ribbons that had become a popular symbol of the movement on site (tied to street railings) and on social media. Journalists covering the event described use of the tune as a protest song.

See also 
 Yellow ribbon
 List of number-one singles of 1973 (Ireland)
 List of Hot 100 number-one singles of 1973 (U.S.)
 List of number-one adult contemporary singles of 1973 (U.S.)
 List of number-one singles from the 1970s (UK)

References

1973 singles
Tony Orlando songs
Johnny Carver songs
Billboard Hot 100 number-one singles
Cashbox number-one singles
Irish Singles Chart number-one singles
Number-one singles in New Zealand
Number-one singles in South Africa
Oricon International Singles Chart number-one singles
RPM Top Singles number-one singles
UK Singles Chart number-one singles
Songs written by L. Russell Brown
Songs written by Irwin Levine
Bell Records singles
Songs about buses
Songs about prison
Songs about trees